Jasmin Bašić (born 7 December 1971) is a Bosnian tenor and author.

He graduated in 2003 and obtained his Master of Music Degree (Vocal performance and pedagogy) from University of Sarajevo in 2006 under famous and world's recognized soprano Radmila Bakočević Belgrade (Serbia).

Up to 2009, he specialized with the Wiener Staatsoper Kammersängerin Olivera Miljaković in Vienna (Austria).
He is employed at the National Theatre Sarajevo as opera soloist and is recognized as vocal pedagogue.
Apart from that he also held solo concerts, and has collaborated with Sarajevo Philharmonic Orchestra and Orchester Pons Artis from Vienna.
In 2016. also jubilee opera season, he performed the duty of artistic director of the opera in Sarajevo.

Opera repertoire
 Nabucco (Verdi) – Ismaele
 Eugene Onegin (Tschaikowsky) – Lenski
 Hasanaginica (Horozić) – Judge of Imotski
 Nikola Šubić Zrinski (opera) (Zajc) – Great Vesire
 The Magic Flute (Mozart) – Monostatos
 Don Giovanni (Mozart) – Don Ottavio
 Le nozze di Figaro (Mozart) – Basilio
 Bastien and Bastienne (Mozart) – Bastien
 Le convenienze ed inconvenienze teatrali (Viva la mamma) (Donizetti) - Stefano
 Carmen (Bizet) – Remendado
 Safikada (Insanić) – Asker
 The Hedgehog's Little House (Vauda) – Wolf (opera for children)
 Aska and The Wolf (Horozić) – Doctor Ovnovic (opera for children)
 La Traviata (Verdi) – Gaston de Letoriéres  
 Rigoletto (Verdi) – Borsa

Operatic repertoire
 Orpheus in the Underworld (Offenbach) – Jupiter
 The Merry Widow (Lehar) – Ambassador Zeta
 Die Csárdásfürstin (The Csárdás Princess) / (Kalman) – Graf Boni Kancianu
 Die Fledermaus (The Bat) / (Strauss) – Alfred

Musical
 Cabaret (musical) (John Kander / Fred Ebb). Adaptation of the musical film "Cabaret" (1972) directed by Bob Fosse – The Emcee
 Annie (musical) (music by Charles Strouse, lyrics by Martin Charnin, and the book by Thomas Meehan) – Oliver "Daddy" Warbucks

Bibliography
 Primadonna Gertruda Munitić. Museum of Literature & Performing Arts Sarajevo, 2017.
 Krunoslav Kruno Cigoj Museum of Literature & Performing Arts Sarajevo,  Matica hrvatske Mostar, Croat Cultural Society Napredak Sarajevo, Croatian Academy of Sciences and Arts B&H, 2019.

Concert repertoire
 L. van Beethoven – Fantasie in C-minor (Solo piano: Mo. Jörg Demus)
 J. Slavenski – Oriental Symphony
 A. Pavlič – Missa bosniensis

Recordings
 CD (live recording) (tenor solo) – "Bosnian Te Deum"- oratorio (M. Katavić)

Gallery

References

 National Theatre Sarajevo / Opera

External links
 Opera Hasanaginica
 Opera Safikada
 Hommage a Pyotr Ilyich Tchaikovsky
 Jasmin Bašić, concert
 Jasmin Bašić, repertoire
 An evening of opera arias
 Collaboration with the Association of Artists "Bellarte" 
 Orpheus in the Underworld at the National Theatre – Banja Luka
 Famous musical Cabaret in Sarajevo
 Musical Annie in Sarajevo
 70th anniversary of the opera in Sarajevo
 "Primadonna Gertruda Munitić" by Jasmin Bašić
 Reportage from the promotion of monograph "Primadonna Gertruda Munitić"
 Interview with Gertrud Munitić
 Reportage from the promotion of monograph "Krunoslav Kruno Cigoj" 

1971 births
Living people
Operatic tenors
Bosniaks of Bosnia and Herzegovina
Bosnia and Herzegovina opera singers
21st-century Bosnia and Herzegovina male singers